The 2018 World Mixed Doubles Curling Championship was held from April 21 to 28 at the Östersund Arena in Östersund, Sweden. The event was held in conjunction with the 2018 World Senior Curling Championships.

Teams

Round-robin standings
Final round-robin standings

Round-robin results
All draw times are listed in CEST (UTC+2)

Group A

Saturday, April 21
Draw 1 9:00

Draw 4 20:00

Sunday, April 22
Draw 6 11:15

Draw 7 14:30

Draw 8 17:45

Draw 9 21:00

Monday, April 23
Draw 10 8:00

Draw 13 17:45

Tuesday, April 24
Draw 15 8:00

Draw 16 11:15

Draw 17 14:30

Draw 18 17:45

Wednesday, April 25
Draw 20 8:00

Draw 22 14:30

Draw 24 21:00

Thursday, April 26
Draw 26 12:30

Draw 27 16:00

Group B

Saturday, April 21
Draw 1 9:00

Draw 3 16:30

Sunday, April 22
Draw 5 8:00

Monday, April 23
Draw 11 11:15

Draw 12 14:30

Draw 14 21:00

Tuesday, April 24
Draw 15 8:00

Draw 17 14:30

Draw 18 17:45

Draw 19 21:00

Wednesday, April 25
Draw 20 8:00

Draw 21 11:15

Draw 22 14:30

Draw 23 17:45

Draw 24 21:00

Thursday, April 26
Draw 28 19:30

Group C

Saturday, April 21
Draw 2 12:30

Draw 3 16:30

Draw 4 20:00

Sunday, April 22
Draw 6 11:15

Draw 7 14:30

Draw 9 21:00

Monday, April 23
Draw 11 11:15

Draw 13 17:45

Draw 14 21:00

Tuesday, April 24
Draw 16 11:15

Draw 17 14:30

Wednesday, April 25
Draw 20 8:00

Draw 22 14:30

Draw 23 17:45

Thursday, April 26
Draw 25 9:00

Draw 26 12:30

Draw 27 16:00

Draw 28 19:30

Group D

Saturday, April 21
Draw 1 9:00

Draw 2 12:30

Draw 3 16:30

Sunday, April 22
Draw 5 8:00

Draw 8 17:45

 ran out of time, and therefore forfeited the game.

Monday, April 23
Draw 10 8:00

Draw 11 11:15

Draw 12 14:30

Draw 13 17:45

Tuesday, April 24
Draw 18 17:45

Draw 19 21:00

Wednesday, April 25
Draw 21 11:15

Draw 22 14:30

Thursday, April 26
Draw 25 8:00

Draw 26 12:30

Draw 27 16:00

Group E

Saturday, April 21
Draw 2 12:30

Draw 4 20:00

Sunday, April 22
Draw 6 11:15

Draw 7 14:30

Draw 9 21:00

Monday, April 23
Draw 10 8:00

Draw 11 11:15

Draw 12 14:30

Draw 14 21:00

Tuesday, April 24
Draw 15 8:00

Draw 16 11:15

Draw 18 17:45

Draw 19 21:00

Wednesday, April 25
Draw 20 8:00

Draw 21 11:15

Draw 23 17:45

Draw 24 21:00

Thursday, April 26
Draw 25 9:00

Draw 26 12:30

Playoffs

Bracket

Round of 16
Friday, April 27, 9:00

Friday, April 27, 12:30

9th–16th Quarterfinals
Friday, April 27, 16:00

Quarterfinals
Friday, April 27, 19:30

9th–12th Semifinals
Saturday, April 28, 8:30

11 v 12
Saturday, April 28, 12:00

5th–8th Semifinals
Saturday, April 28, 12:00

Semifinals
Saturday, April 28, 12:00

9 v 10
Saturday, April 28, 16:00

7 v 8
Saturday, April 28, 16:00

5 v 6
Saturday, April 28, 16:00

Bronze medal game
Saturday, April 28, 16:00

Gold medal game
Saturday, April 28, 16:00

Top 5 Player percentages
Round robin only

References

External links

World Mixed Doubles Curling Championship
World Mixed Doubles Curling Championship
World Mixed Doubles Curling Championship
International curling competitions hosted by Sweden
Sports competitions in Östersund
World Mixed Doubles Curling Championship